The White Shoes may refer to:
The White Shoes, earlier name of Dutch band The Shoes
The White Shoes (song), song by the rap artist Wale on The Album About Nothing

See also
White Shoes (disambiguation)